Kass is a surname. It originated in several different ways, including as a nickname in former eastern territories of Germany from the Czech word  ("blackbird" or "shrewd person"), from the Estonian word kass meaning cat, from the given name Gazo, as an Ashkenazi Jewish surname from the given name Casriel, and possibly as an Americanized spelling of Káš or Kaše. The 2010 United States census found 3,796 people with the surname Kass, making it the 8,655th-most-common surname in the country, compared to 3,523 people (8,599th-most-common) in the 2000 census. In both US censuses, more than nine-tenths of the bearers of the surname identified as non-Hispanic white.

People with the surname include:
Amalie Kass (1928–2019), American historian
Amy Kass (born 1940), American humanities scholar
Carmen Kass (born 1978), Estonian model
Danny Kass (born 1982), American snowboarder
Deborah Kass (born 1952), American painter
Edward H. Kass (1917-1990), American physician, professor and historian
James R. Kass, Canadian physicist
János Kass (1927–2010), Hungarian illustrator
Jerome Kass (1937-2015), American screenwriter and author
Johannes Kass (born 1949), Estonian politician
John Kass (born 1956), American journalist
Kristiina Kass (born 1970), Estonian children's writer and illustrator
Leon Kass (born 1939), American bioethicist
Leonhard Kass (1911–1985), Estonian footballer
Peter Kass (1923–2008), American acting teacher and director
Pnina Moed Kass (born 1938), Belgian writer
Ras Kass (born John Austin, 1973), American rapper
Raye Kass, Canadian social scientist
Rob Kass, American statistician
Robin Kåss (born 1977), Norwegian medical doctor and politician
Ron Kass (1935–1986), American businessman, recording executive, and film producer
Sam Kass (born 1980), American chef

See also
 Cass (surname)

References

Estonian-language surnames
German-language surnames